Michael Fowler (1929–2022) was a New Zealand politician and architect.

Michael Fowler may also refer to:
Michael Fowler (judge) (born 1951), British judge
Mike Fowler (born 1982), American martial artist

See also